Shebah Ronay (born 1972, London) is a British actress, known for her brief film and television career from 1989–1998, including, Reunion (1989), Hollyoaks (1995–1996) and The Man Who Cried (1993). She is married to artist Jonathan Yeo. They have two children. She is the granddaughter of the Hungarian-born food critic Egon Ronay and the daughter of fashion designer and former actress Edina Ronay.

Filmography
Reunion (1989), Young Countess Gertrud
The Man Who Cried (1993), Daphne
Things We Do for Love (1998), Girl (short film)

Television
Hollyoaks (1995–1996), Natasha Andersen
Game On (1995), Hairdresser / Jessica
Love Hurts (1994), Receptionist
The House of Eliott (1994), Jessica Armstrong
Covington Cross (1992), Antonia

References

External links

English actresses
1972 births
Living people
British people of Hungarian descent